Interstate 64 (I-64) in the US state of Indiana is a major east–west highway providing access between Illinois and Kentucky. It passes through southern Indiana as part of its connection between the two metropolitan areas of St Louis, Missouri, and Louisville, Kentucky.

Route description

I-64 has a route through the state which travels through mostly rural areas, passing through all four Indiana counties of the Evansville metropolitan area, but the final portion of the route is encompassed by the Louisville metropolitan area. The highway enters Indiana after crossing the Wabash River from Illinois. It passes through Posey County before straddling the Gibson–Vanderburgh county line, where it connects with U.S. Highway 41 (US 41) and I-69 which travels south to Evansville and north to Martinsville, both intersections being within Gibson County. Continuing eastward, I-64 passes through Warrick County before straddling the Spencer–Dubois county line, which is also the boundary between the Central and the Eastern time zones. It continues into and through Perry County (back in the Central Time Zone), before crossing into Crawford County where, from that point on, it remains in the Eastern Time Zone. (Between milemarkers 60 and 80, I-64 crosses the Central/Eastern time zone boundary five times). This portion of the route also travels through Hoosier National Forest through several sharp valleys and steep hills, largely in Perry, Crawford, and Harrison counties with some large hills in Spencer and Dubois counties as well. Beyond the forest, the Interstate travels through Harrison and Floyd counties, before crossing the Sherman Minton Bridge over the Ohio River into Louisville, Kentucky. Between Spencer County and Louisville, the highway traverses sharp valleys and hills.

History
I-64 was built across the eastern US between St. Louis and the Hampton Roads area of Virginia in the 1960s and 1970s. In Indiana, the highway was originally routed along US 50, but political influences from Evansville rerouted the highway along US 460 (since decommissioned in Indiana).

Initial construction
Like all Interstate highways in Indiana, I-64 was constructed in segments which, when all were complete, made up the route in use today. There were eight segments in all, with the first to be opened being the very short segment from the Kentucky state line on the Sherman Minton Bridge to Spring Street in New Albany, which became operational on December 22, 1961. By the end of 1968, two more segments consisting of  had opened, one near each end of the route in the state. By the end of 1972, two more segments were completed in southwestern Indiana, and I-64 was open from State Road 57 (SR 57; later, also I-164 and now part of the extension of I-69) north of Evansville west to the Illinois state line. The three final segments of I-64 in the long stretch between SR 57 and SR 64 in Floyd County were completed later in the decade, with the final stretch opening near Ferdinand in 1979.

Subsequent improvements and developments

The Sherman Minton Bridge across the Ohio River was closed in 2011 after two major cracks were found. However, the bridge reopened the following February after extensive repairs.

Future
The Ohio River Bridges Project in the Louisville/Falls City metro area, while mainly affecting I-65 and I-265, has sparked opposition, most notably 8664, which calls for I-64 to be rerouted out of downtown Louisville (and, thus, the Minton Bridge) onto the new, extended route for I-265. They suggest the portion of I-64 between the current I-64/I-265 interchange in New Albany and its Kentucky counterpart be resigned as I-364.

Exit list

See also

References

External links

Indiana Highway Ends: Interstate 64

 Indiana
64
Transportation in Posey County, Indiana
Transportation in Vanderburgh County, Indiana
Transportation in Gibson County, Indiana
Transportation in Warrick County, Indiana
Transportation in Spencer County, Indiana
Transportation in Dubois County, Indiana
Transportation in Perry County, Indiana
Transportation in Crawford County, Indiana
Transportation in Harrison County, Indiana
Transportation in Floyd County, Indiana